Carole Bouzidi (born 25 June 1985 in Paris) is a French-Algerian slalom canoeist who has competed at the international level since 2002. She has represented Algeria since 2022.

She won two medals in the K1 team event at the ICF Canoe Slalom World Championships with a gold in 2014 and a bronze in 2015. She also won five medals (2 golds, 1 silver and 2 bronzes) at the European Championships.

World Cup individual podiums

References

External links

French female canoeists
Algerian female canoeists
Living people
1985 births
Sportspeople from Paris
Medalists at the ICF Canoe Slalom World Championships